BSSD may refer to:

Bally Sports San Diego, American regional sports network owned and operated by Bally Sports
Bangalore School of Speech and Drama, a drama school in India
Bering Strait School District, in northwestern Alaska, United States
Birmingham School of Acting, a drama school in Birmingham, United Kingdom
Blairsville-Saltsburg School District, in Indiana County, Pennsylvania, United States
Blue Springs R-IV School District, in Blue Springs, Missouri, United States
Board solid-state drive, a cost-optimized implementation of an SSD in a different form factor